Dan Babos (born 1 March 2000) is a Welsh rugby union player who plays for Pontypool RFC team as a scrum-half.

Having begun his career playing for Pontypool schools and Pontypool United RFC, Babos made his debut for the Dragons regional team in 2017.  With his appearance he became the first player born in the 21st century to appear in the Pro14 competition. His half-back partner that day, former Wales international Gavin Henson, had made his own professional debut in 2001 when Babos was just six months old.

He has also represented Wales under-20.

In 2022, Babos joined Coventry R.F.C. on loan.

Babos was released by the Dragons at the end of the 2021–2022 season, and joined Pontypool RFC.

References

External links 
Dragons profile

Welsh rugby union players
Dragons RFC players
Living people
2000 births
Rugby union players from Newport, Wales
Rugby union scrum-halves
Coventry R.F.C. players
Pontypool RFC players